Edmund Wallace Hildick (1925–2001) was a prolific children's book author, who wrote under the name E. W. Hildick. He wrote, amongst others, the Ghost Squad, Jim Starling, Birdy Jones, Jack McGurk and Lemon Kelly series.

Background 
He was born in Bradford, England in 1925. After two years service in the RAF, he became a secondary school teacher, then a writer, before moving to the United States to become editor of a literary magazine. He was one of the very few British juvenile authors of his generation to achieve success in America.

He started writing while he was a teacher in a Secondary Modern school at Dewsbury, in the West Riding of Yorkshire in England, his intended audience being "tough, modern kids similar to the ones I teach". He died in London England.

Series

Jim Starling 

 Jim Starling (1958)
 Jim Starling and the Agency (1958)
 Jim Starling and the Colonel (1958)
 Jim Starling's Holiday (1960)
 Jim Starling and the Spotted Dog (1963)
 Jim Starling Goes To Town (1963)
 Jim Starling Takes Over (1963)

McGurk Mystery 

 The Nose Knows (1963)
 Dolls in Danger (1974; aka Deadline for McGurk)
 The Case of the Condemned Cat (1975)
 The Case of the Nervous Newsboy (1976)
 The Great Rabbit Robbery (1976; aka "The Great Rabbit Rip-Off")
 The Case of the Invisible Dog (1977)
 The Case of the Secret Scribbler (1978)
 The Case of the Phantom Frog (1979)
 The Case of the Treetop Treasure (1980)
 The Case of the Snowbound Spy (1980)
 The Case of the Bashful Bank Robber (1981)
 The Case of the Four Flying Fingers (1981)
 Mcgurk Gets Good and Mad (1982)
 The Case of the Felon's Fiddle (1982)
 The Case of the Slingshot Sniper (1983)
 The Case of the Muttering Mummy (1986)
 The Case of the Wandering Weathervanes (1988)
 The Case of the Vanishing Ventriloquist (1989)
 The Case Of The Purloined Parrot (1990)
 The Case of the Desperate Drummer (1993)
 The Case of the Fantastic Footprints (1994)
 The Case of the Absent Author (1995)
 The Case Of The Wiggling Wig (1996)

McGurk Fantasy 

 The Case of the Dragon in Distress (1991)
 The Case of the Weeping Witch (1992)

Birdy Jones 

 Birdy Jones (1963)
 Birdy and the Group (1968)
 Birdy Swings North (1969)
 Birdy in Amsterdam (1970)
 Birdy Jones and the New York Heads (1974)

Lemon Kelly 

 Meet Lemon Kelly (1963)
 Lemon Kelly Digs Deep (1964)
 Lemon Kelly and the Home Made Boy (1968)

Louie 

 Louie's Lot (1965)
 Louie's S.O.S (1968)
 Louie's Snowstorm (1974)
 Louie's Ransom (1978)

Questers 

 The Questers (1966)
 The Questers and the Whispering Spy (1967)

Crown books, one crown 

 Back with Parren (1968)
 Here Comes Parren (1968)

Ghost Squad 

 1. Ghost Squad Breaks Through (1984)
 2. Ghost Squad and Halloween Conspiracy (1985)
 2. Ghost Squad and the Prowling Hermits (1987)
 3. The Ghost Squad Flies Concorde (1985)
 6. The Ghost Squad and the Menace of the Malevs (1988)
 Ghost Squad and the Ghoul of Grunberg (1986)

Felicity Snell Mystery 

 The Purloined Corn Popper (1997)
 The Serial Sneak Thief (1997)

Alison McNair 

 The Active-Enzyme Lemon-Freshened Junior High School Witch (1973)
 The Top-Flight Fully-Automated Junior High School Girl Detective (1978)

Novels 

 The Boy At the Window (1960)
 Bed and Work (1962)
 Mapper Mundy's Treasure Hunt (1963)
 A Town On the Never (1963)
 Lunch with Ashurbanipal (1965)
 Calling Questers Four (1967)
 Lucky Les (1967)
 Time Explorers, Inc (1967)
 Manhattan Is Missing (1969)
 Monte Carlo Or Bust! (1969)
 Those Daring Young Men In Their Jaunty Jalopies (1969)
 Top Boy At Twisters Creek (1969)
 The Prisoners of Gridling Gap (1971)
 The Doughnut Dropout (1972)
 Kids Commune (1972)
 Bracknell's Law (1975)
 The Weirdown Experiment (1976)
 A Cat Called Amnesia (1976)
 Vandals (1977)
 The Loop (1977)
 The Memory Tap (1989)
 My Famous Father (1990)
 Hester Bidgood (1994)

Non-fiction 

 Word for Word: The Rewriting of Fiction (1965)
 Writing With Care (1967)
 A Close Look at Television and Sound Broadcasting (1967)
 Thirteen Types of Narrative (1968)
 Children and Fiction (1970)

Notes

External links

Hildick family member website

English children's writers
Writers from Bradford
1925 births
2001 deaths